The American Athletic Conference men's basketball tournament (sometimes known simply as The American Championship) is the conference tournament in basketball for the American Athletic Conference. It is a single-elimination tournament that involves all league schools (12 with the addition of Wichita State for the 2017–18 season). Its seeding is based on regular season records. The winner receives the conference's automatic bid to the NCAA men's basketball tournament; however, the official conference championship is awarded to the team or teams with the best regular season record.

The creation of the conference tournament was a product of the split of the original Big East Conference.  While The American is the legal successor to the old Big East, it gave up the rights to the long-standing conference tournament at Madison Square Garden in New York City to the new Big East.  As a result, the 2014 tournament was numbered as the first tournament for the conference.

Champions 

 Louisville was forced to vacate their 2014 win due to 2015 sex scandal

Tournament championships by school

Italics indicate school no longer sponsors men's basketball in The American.

See also
 Big East men's basketball tournament
 American Athletic Conference women's basketball tournament

References

 
Recurring sporting events established in 2014
2014 establishments in Tennessee